Li Binzhu (8 November 1921 – 12 July 2007)  was a Chinese-Austrian judge and politician. She was a long-time fighter in the war of the Second Sino-Japanese War. She developed a school model for literacy of rural women. In 1945, she married Austrian physician Richard Frey, an antifascist fighter in Yan'an. In the period of the civil war and after the founding of the People's Republic of China she worked as a judge, later as a process leader and as a commissioner in the People's Procuratorate. In 1958 she and her husband had to give up their posts for political reasons. She then worked as a principal in a high school and became a critic of the political movements Anti-Rightist Campaign and Great Leap Forward. In 1959, under political pressure, she finally had to annul her marriage and raise her three children on her own. After overcoming a severe depression, she worked until her retirement in 1982 as a party secretary in the clothing industry. She died 2007 in Vienna.

Early life
Li Binzhu was born in Yanshi County, Henan, China. Her father practiced traditional Chinese medicine in the countryside. During her time at the county middle school, her political stand was actively influenced by her Chinese language teacher and communist Wu Zhipu. 1936 she joined the Chinese National Liberation Vanguard Organization. In 1937, after the Marco Polo Bridge Incident, she left the Pedagogical Art School in Henan Province and returned to Yanshi to participate in the War of Resistance against Japan. To appeal to the Liberation Movement, Li Binzhu organized the Reading-/ Women's Group and the National Liberation Theater in Yanshi. She joined the Communist Party of China (CPC) in February 1938. In July of the same year, she took leave of her home, went to Yan'an and devoted herself wholeheartedly to the cause of the war against Japanese aggression.

Second Sino-Japanese War
By the end of the Second Sino-Japanese War, Li Binzhu lived in Yan'an for eight years. She studied Jurisprudence at the university there, worked in the security bureau of the Shaan-Gan-Ning Border Region, and later in the education department of the Guanzhong 
Zone Commission.

In 1943, Li Binzhu was assigned by the CCP to conduct the so-called "winter learning campaign" through literacy, poverty reduction and backwardness in the Londong area, one of the CCP's resistance centers. Initially, she taught the farmers to read in her winter school, teaching them socially, politically, and scientifically learnings. Quickly Li Binzhu realized that due to poverty and lack of education, the old customs still continued to exist, such as: The Child marriage, the Foot binding, superstition of the witch doctor, ignorance of the social life and women's suffrage. In the region there was still a very high number of gynecological diseases and a high infant mortality. In this village, 43 out of 54 women suffered from gynecological diseases, and among 194 newborns, 106 were reported to have died.
According to the local conditions she analyzed, Li Binzhu worked on a new implementation strategy. She changed the winter school curriculum and focused on hygiene instruction and obstetrics as the main teaching content. Chinese characters and other knowledge were taught to female participants as well. This was so well received by the population that the number of participants tripled within a week. Many women now enthusiastically attended classes. Because the school achieved very positive results and was very polarizing, the school model was quickly promoted and implemented throughout the region.
Li Binzhu's work was highly prized by the CCP Central Committee. Xu Teli, Mao Zedong's teacher, president of the Yan'an Academy of Natural Sciences, said of her winter school: "This school taught people the practical knowledge of life. Once the problem of the Obstructed labour (severe birth, risk birth) of women is resolved, the old thinking in the past history is corrected, that Manuscript culture (education) of women is useless." Lin Boqu, President of the Border Region, gave her an honorary title. Li Binzhu's winter school model has been described in "Chinese Educational History" and "Modern Chinese History."

Chinese Civil War
On 15 July 1945 Li Binzhu married Dr. Richard Frey, who was a researcher and lecturer at the China Medical University (PRC) in Yan'an at the time. After defeating the War of Resistance, Richard Frey and Li Binzhu, who was pregnant at the time, marched with the army into the Zhangjiakou City Liberation Zone. In 1946, Li Binzhu worked as a judge at the People's Court of Zhangjiakou City, while caring for her child born in the war and assisting her husband in producing penicillin, which he had already started in Yan'an. After the outbreak of the civil war, the city of Zhangjiakou fell into the hands of Kuomintang Party. In September 1946, she moved to the CCP base of Jin-Cha-Ji Tang County. After that, Li Binzhu worked as a party secretary of the student organization at the Medical University of North China, and also participated in the local land reform in Tang County.

People's Republic of China
After the founding of the People's Republic of China in 1949, in March 1950, Li Binzhu was transferred from the China University of Political Science and Law to the Supreme People's Court of the People's Republic of China in Beijing, and was soon transferred back to Chongqing City, which was being conquered by the Communists. She was responsible for the preparation of the establishment of a southwest branch of the Supreme People's Court of the Central People's Government and hold the process manager after the establishment.

In 1954 she worked as a commissioner in the southwestern branch of China's Supreme People's Procuratorate in Chongqing. Due to the extreme left-wing course within the party against foreign-born officials, the couple Li Binzhu and Richard Frey were forced to resign from government posts in 1958. Li Binzhu left the Southwest Branch of the Supreme People's Procuratorate and was assigned a new job as the principal of Chongqing High School No. 29.
While assuming the role of school principal, the political movement "Anti-Rightist Campaign" also spread in her school. Following her knowledge of human nature, she assigned people like the former headmaster, party secretary and teachers, who were considered problematic in the movement due to their different ways of thinking and thus lost their work, to do the corresponding work. The subsequent movement "Great Leap Forward" also affected High School No. 29. A campaign to increase steel production in the country was carried out at the school. Teachers and students built simple "backyard blast furnaces" made of bricks in the schoolyard. Each brought home metal ware to school, threw it into the blast furnaces with no expertise, where the unusable scrap was melted down to extract "steel." Li Binzhu criticized the absurd action and questioned both unscientific and uneconomic steel production. For her behavior in the two political movements Li Binzhu paid a high price. She was severely cautioned by the party and, after just one year as a high school director, transferred to work in a municipal people's commune.

The consequences of the "Great Leap Forward" were one of the main causes of the ensuing century catastrophe, the Great Chinese Famine in China. One of the particularly affected provinces was Henan. Around three million people were starving to death there, including Li Binzhu's parents. She had left her home and her parents at the age of 16 and was suffering from the fact that she could not afford to pay them their last respect because of her own difficult life.

After repeated political misfortunes and the death of her parents, Li Binzhu experienced her own family disaster in 1959 under the high pressure of the political "left" route. Due to his foreign origin as a foreigner, her husband was under general suspicion as a spy. The party called on Li Binzhu to demarcate herself politically. To protect their three underaged children, they decided to temporarily cancel their marriage. These successive blows caused Li Binzhu a lifelong severe depression. She was therefore later treated in a special hospital for a long time.

In 1962, Zhou Enlai transferred Richard Frey, who had since remarried to Chongqing, to the "Chinese Academy of Medical Sciences" in Beijing. Li Binzhu remained in Chongqing and worked again, thanks to her indomitable will after years of treatment for her depression as party secretary in Chongqing's urban garment industry. She raised her three children alone. During the Cultural Revolution, she once again suffered under the espionage charge of her divorced husband, but was able to survive this political movement through her human-oriented leadership style. In 1982, she retired as head of the Discipline Inspection Derivation for the Chengdu City Light Industry Bureau.

Later years

In the early 1990s, Li Binzhu, who had never remarried and lived alone, visited her children in Vienna, the hometown of Richard Frey. In 1994, she suffered a severe stroke there, which resulted in paralysis. She spent her remaining life in the "hospital Hietzing" and in the "Kaiser-Franz-Josef-Spital". During her treatment and stay in the hospital she always received the attention and help of the government of both countries. For her birthday, the mayor of Vienna wrote her a letter of sympathy. In 2005, on the occasion of the commemoration of the 60th anniversary of the victory in the War of Resistance, the Chinese ambassador of Austria visited her in the hospital. She received the resistance war gold medal.

Li Binzhu died on 12 July 2007 in Vienna. The mourning statement of the Chinese Embassy in Vienna was as follows: "Comrade Li Bin Zhu was a war veteran who made important contributions to the war of resistance against Japanese aggression. She experienced the high and low, success and tribulation both in time of war, as in peacetime and in difficult time of the country. We will never forget her loyalty, selflessness and fighting spirit, the Chinese people will always remember her. "

On June 23, 2007, Li Binzhu's ashes were buried in the Vienna Central Cemetery, and on that day, on the other half of the earth in China, in Tang County, the ashes of Richard Frey at the "Jin Cha Ji Martyrs Cemetery", on the former war front, was also buried. Li Binzhu and her deceased husband, the Austrian-Jewish physician Richard Frey, a Eurasian couple, comrades in the Resistance War, were randomly and miraculously buried in the country of their partner's home that same day, and from then on, they found their eternal rest in each other's homeland.

References 

《解放日报》1944.05.12
《国际共产主义战士傅莱》/R.161
《怀念傅莱》
《Inside China》
 《中国现代史》

1921 births
2007 deaths
Austrian judges
Chinese Communist Party politicians from Henan
Chinese emigrants to Austria
Chinese women in politics
Chinese women judges
People from Yanshi
People of the Republic of China
People's Republic of China politicians from Henan
Politicians from Luoyang